The 1889–90 Irish Cup was the tenth edition of the premier knock-out cup competition in Irish football. 

Gordon Highlanders (a British Army team) won the tournament for the first and only time, defeating Cliftonville 3–0 in the final replay, after an initial 2–2 draw.

Results

First round

|}

Replays

|}

Second round

|}

1 Match was ordered to be replayed after a protest by St Columb's Court regarding Limavady's rough play.

Replays

|}

Third round

|}

Fourth round

|}

Semi-finals

|}

1 Match was ordered to be replayed after a protest.

Replay

|}

Final

Replay

References

External links
 Northern Ireland Cup finals. Rec.Sport.Soccer Statistics Foundation (RSSSF)

Irish Cup seasons
1889–90 domestic association football cups